Mianej (also Romanized as Mīānej; also known as Mīāneh and Miyana) is a village in Ilat-e Qaqazan-e Sharqi Rural District, Kuhin District, Qazvin County, Qazvin Province, Iran. At the 2006 census, its population was 171, in 46 families.

References 

Populated places in Qazvin County